Wooseok X Kuanlin (우석X관린) is a South Korean musical duo formed by Cube Entertainment in 2019, composed of Wooseok of Pentagon and Lai Kuan-lin, a former member of Wanna One. On February 20, 2019, Cube Entertainment announced the formation of a new group project featuring Lai alongside Wooseok. The duo debuted on March 11 of the same year with 9801, featuring title song "I'm a Star".

History

Pre-debut 

On February 19, 2019, Cube Entertainment announced a new unit. On February 22, Cube officially revealed the unit's name and members.

2019: Debut with 9801 
Wooseok X Kuanlin debuted on March 11, 2019 with the EP 9801 and its title track "I'm A Star". The EP contains one unit track and two solo songs each from the members. It debuted at number two on the Gaon Weekly Album Chart and sold over thirty-six thousand copies.

Discography

Extended plays

Singles

References

 

Pentagon (South Korean band)
Cube Entertainment artists
K-pop music groups
South Korean musical duos
South Korean hip hop groups
Musical groups from Seoul
Musical groups established in 2019
2019 establishments in South Korea
South Korean pop music groups
Wooseok